Into the Open, subtitled "New Paintings, Prints and Sculptures by Contemporary Black Artists", was an exhibition of art by black artists displayed at various venues in the United Kingdom in 1984.

This exhibition was the first major survey by a municipal gallery of contemporary work by black artists in Britain, and is considered one of the landmark exhibitions of the 1980s. It was curated, at the invitation of Sheffield City Arts Department, by two people closely involved with black artists in Britain: Pogus Caesar and Lubaina Himid.  Their stated aim was to give an indication of the range and richness of art made by contemporary Afro Caribbean artists.

The Into the Open exhibition toured in the United Kingdom in 1984, appearing at three venues: the Mappin Art Gallery in Sheffield (4 August–9 September 1984), the Castle Museum in Nottingham (16 September–21 October 1984), and the Newcastle Media Workshops in Newcastle-upon-Tyne (2–24 November 1984). It was organized by the Sheffield Arts Department and was subsidised by the Arts Council of Great Britain.

Artists in the exhibition  

 Clement Bedeau
 Sylbert Bolton
 Sonia Boyce
 Pogus Caesar
 Eddie A. Chambers
 Shakka Dedi
 Uzo Egonu
 Lubaina Himid
 Gavin Jantjes
 Claudette Johnson
 Tom Joseph
 Juginder Lamba
 Bill Ming
 Ossie Murray
 Houria Niati
 Benjamin Nhlanhla Nsusha
 Pitika P. Ntuli
 Keith Piper
 Richie Riley
 Veronica Ryan
 Jorge Santos

References

External links
See examples of work by Uzo Egonu plus text of a lecture on his life 

Art exhibitions in the United Kingdom
1984 in the United Kingdom
1984 in art
Black British culture